RMAF Subang  is an air force base operated by the Royal Malaysian Air Force. It is located on the edge of Shah Alam, a town in Selangor in Peninsular Malaysia and shares runway facilities with the Sultan Abdul Aziz Shah Airport.

History

RMAF Subang are officially established in 1985. The original purpose of the establishment of this airbase was mainly for tactical airlift and maritime operation. RMAF's aircraft that operates from this airbase including airlifter such as Airbus A400M Atlas, Lockheed C-130 Hercules and CASA/IPTN CN-235. This airbase also operates RMAF's VIP aircraft such as Boeing 737, Airbus A319, Dassault Falcon 900 and Bombardier Global Express and rotorcraft Sikorsky UH-60 Black Hawk. Due to its purpose for maritime operation, RMAF also stationed Beechcraft Super King Air maritime patrol aircraft in this airbase.

See also

 Sultan Abdul Aziz Shah Airport-the Civilian airport sharing runway facilities with the Air Base
 Royal Malaysian Air Force bases
 List of airports in Malaysia

References

Airports in Selangor